Vincent Ned DeRosa (October 5, 1920 – July 18, 2022) was an American hornist who served as a studio musician for Hollywood soundtracks and other recordings from 1935 until his retirement in 2008. Because his career spanned over 70 years, during which he played on many film and television soundtracks and as a sideman on studio albums, he is considered to be one of the most recorded brass players of all time. He set "impeccably high standards" for the horn, and became the first horn for Henry Mancini, Lalo Schifrin, Alfred Newman, and John Williams, among others, with Williams calling him "one of the greatest instrumentalists of his generation." DeRosa contributed to many of the most acclaimed albums of the 20th century, including some of the biggest-selling albums by artists as diverse as Frank Sinatra, Barry Manilow, Frank Zappa, Boz Scaggs, Ella Fitzgerald, Harry Nilsson, Stan Kenton, Henry Mancini, The Monkees, Sammy Davis Jr., and Mel Tormé.

Early life and training 

DeRosa was born in Kansas City, Missouri, on October 5, 1920. His family moved to Chicago about a year after his birth. His father, John DeRosa, was a professional clarinetist; his mother, Clelia DeRubertis DeRosa, was an accomplished singer. He began his horn studies at age ten with Peter Di Lecce, Principal Horn of the Chicago Symphony Orchestra. In 1932, the family moved to Los Angeles. While still a teenager, DeRosa studied briefly with his uncle, Vincent DeRubertis. He also studied with and played several times for Alfred Edwin Brain Jr., Dennis Brain's uncle.

Career 

DeRosa began his professional career in 1935 by substituting for another player in the San Carlo Opera Company's production of La traviata. When the U.S. entered World War II, DeRosa enlisted before he could be drafted and was assigned to play with the California Army Air Forces radio production unit. He was discharged in 1943 because he was the head of a household. However, eventually he was recalled to service and was demobilized in 1945.

Recording 

DeRosa's recording career began shortly after his military service ended, and he quickly established himself as the first-call session horn player in the recording industry. He recorded extensively in several genres, including jazz, rock, pop, and classical. His name has become a metaphor for prolific recording: in Collected Thoughts on Teaching and Learning, Creativity, and Horn Performance Douglas Hill refers to a prolific session player as "the Vince DeRosa of the London freelance scene."

Albums 

As a jazz player, he is recognized as one of the first French horn players to forge a career as a jazz sideman. During his career, he played on important jazz instrumental recordings, including Art Pepper's Art Pepper + Eleven – Modern Jazz Classics, Stan Kenton's Kenton / Wagner, and Johnny Mandel's I Want to Live!. He also appeared on landmark recordings by jazz vocalists, including Mel Tormé and the Marty Paich Dek-Tette, Ella Fitzgerald Sings the Rodgers & Hart Song Book and Ella Fitzgerald Sings the George and Ira Gershwin Song Book, Sammy Davis Jr.'s The Wham of Sam, and June Christy's Something Cool. DeRosa also contributed to important jazz fusion recordings, including David Axelrod's Song of Innocence and groundbreaking albums by Jean-Luc Ponty including King Kong: Jean-Luc Ponty Plays the Music of Frank Zappa.

As a sideman on pop records, his contributions to Sinatra's most important recordings are perhaps best known (see with "Work with Sinatra" below). However, he also contributed to many other hit pop recordings such as Barry Manilow's triple-platinum album Even Now, Neil Diamond's hit September Morn, and Louis Armstrong's I’ve Got the World on a String and Louis Under the Stars, two of the most important pop albums from Armstrong's later catalog.

As a sideman on rock, blues, and funk records, DeRosa contributed to seminal recordings such as Frank Zappa's first solo album Lumpy Gravy, Boz Scaggs' quintuple-platinum Silk Degrees, and Tower of Power's Back to Oakland, and to rock cult classics such as Harry Nilsson's Son of Schmilsson and Van Dyke Parks's Song Cycle.

DeRosa was also an accomplished classical player. He was the hornist on the album The Intimate Bach which received a Grammy Nomination for Best Classical Performance – Chamber Music (1962).  Music critic Alfred Frankenstein wrote of DeRosa's performance on this record, "This is the most astonishing example of virtuosity on the horn I have ever heard on records...To play as lightly and speedily as a harpsichord, right out in the open with a minimum of support, is to give an incredible performance."

Soundtracks 

In addition to his work as a sideman, DeRosa appeared on many prominent soundtracks for film, musicals, and TV, including Carousel, Close Encounters of the Third Kind, Edward Scissorhands, How the West Was Won, Jaws, Mary Poppins, Midway, Oklahoma, My Fair Lady, Rocky, The Days of Wine and Roses, The Magnificent Seven, The Music Man, and The Sound of Music. The television programs for which he played include Batman, Bonanza, Dallas, Hawaii Five-O, Peter Gunn, Star Trek, The Rockford Files, and The Simpsons.

Work with Frank Sinatra 

DeRosa's playing and career are closely associated with Frank Sinatra's recordings because of Frank Sinatra's fame, the number of seminal Sinatra albums on which DeRosa played, and two highly publicized accounts of Sinatra's comments to or about DeRosa (see below). DeRosa played first horn on many albums considered to be the greatest in Sinatra's catalog and among the greatest of all time, including In the Wee Small Hours, Songs for Swingin’ Lovers!, Frank Sinatra Sings for Only the Lonely, and Strangers in the Night.

Sinatra was not known for openly complimenting his musicians (drummer Irv Cottler once said, "Frank will never come right out and tell you that you swung your ass off"). However, he publicly acknowledged DeRosa's excellence. In Sinatra: The Chairman, author James Kaplan discusses DeRosa with Milt Bernhart, a trombonist who had played with both Sinatra and DeRosa on many occasions: "Another time, Bernhart remembered, Sinatra praised French horn player Vince DeRosa on executing a difficult passage by telling the band, 'I wish you guys could have heard Vince DeRosa last night—I could have hit him in the mouth!' We all knew what he meant—he had loved it!" Bernhart said. "And believe me, he reserved comments like that only for special occasions."Another reason DeRosa is closely associated with Sinatra is that an exchange between DeRosa and Sinatra was featured in the article "Frank Sinatra Has a Cold" for Esquire by Gay Talese in 1966. The article became one of the most famous pieces of magazine journalism ever written, and is often considered not only the greatest profile of Frank Sinatra but one of the greatest celebrity profiles ever written. In his piece, Talese documents the following touching conversation between Sinatra and DeRosa:
When a French horn player, a short Italian named Vincent DeRosa who has played with Sinatra since The Lucky Strike "Hit Parade" days on radio, strolled by, Sinatra reached out to hold him for a second.
"Vincenzo," Sinatra said, "how's your little girl?" "She's fine, Frank."
"Oh, she's not a little girl anymore," Sinatra corrected himself, "she's a big girl now."
"Yes, she goes to college now. U.S.C."
"That's great."
"She's also got a little talent, I think, Frank, as a singer."
Sinatra was silent for a moment, then said, "Yes, but it's very good for her to get her education first, Vincenzo."
Vincent DeRosa nodded.
"Yes, Frank," he said, and then he said, "Well, good night, Frank." "Good night, Vincenzo."
The exchange was given renewed exposure by Pulitzer Prize-winning music critic Alex Ross in his book Listen to This. In the chapter "Edges of Pop," Ross highlights the famous article and calls the exchange between DeRosa and Sinatra "The sweetest moment in Gay Talese’s classic Esquire profile."

One reason for DeRosa's appearance on so many of Sinatra's albums is that DeRosa was the preferred first horn for Sinatra's frequent collaborator Nelson Riddle (Riddle's biographer refers to DeRosa as a "horn player extraordinaire"). As an example of Riddle's esteem for DeRosa, he chose DeRosa as a featured soloist on the Sinatra album Close to You, an album on which the Hollywood String Quartet and typically one soloist per song accompanied Sinatra. Riddle was deliberate in his choice of sideman, selecting trumpeter Harry "Sweets" Edison, clarinetist Mahlon Clark, and DeRosa for this project.

Work with Henry Mancini 

While DeRosa might be most closely associated with Frank Sinatra, he is also well known as Henry Mancini's first-call horn player, working with Mancini on at least eight albums and many film scores. The albums included The Music from Peter Gunn, the first album to win the Grammy award for Album of the Year (1959) and was selected by the Library of Congress as a 2010 addition to the National Recording Registry, which selects recordings annually that are "culturally, historically, or aesthetically significant." The album's title song features famous, difficult-to-execute French horn lines, with DeRosa as first chair.

Mancini often composed his themes with a favorite player in mind: "Sometimes when I hear people play, especially if they’re distinctive players, I actually try to incorporate their sound into a particular score."  Mancini had Vince DeRosa in mind when he composed his Academy Award-winning theme to the film Days of Wine and Roses: "For the first yawning notes of this score, he was hearing the solid round tone of studio veteran French horn soloist Vince DeRosa, and that became the voice of solitude in the film." This theme won the 1962 Academy Award for best song.

Influence 

DeRosa's impact on studio horn playing was significant, and set a new standard for studio horn parts. As a sideman on thousands of sessions and a horn instructor at USC and elsewhere, DeRosa influenced many musicians and composers. The list below documents composers and musicians who are publicly acknowledged to have studied with, or been influenced by, DeRosa's teaching or playing.

Composers 

 John Williams (American composer who has written some of the most popular and recognizable film scores in cinematic history). At DeRosa's retirement concert/celebration, composer John Williams wrote:

"Vince Derosa's contribution to American music can't be overstated. He was the premier first horn player on virtually every recording to come out of Hollywood for over forty years. He represented the pinnacle of instrumental performance and I can honestly say that what I know about writing for the French horn, I learned from him. DeRosa was an inspiration for at least two generations of composers working in Hollywood and beyond. He is respected world-wide and universally regarded as one of the greatest instrumentalists of his generation. It has been a privilege to have worked with him all these many years."

 Henry Mancini (American composer, conductor and arranger, often cited as one of the greatest composers in the history of film). Mancini had Vince DeRosa in mind when he composed his Academy Award-winning theme to the film Days of Wine and Roses.

Horn players 

The following horn players have publicly acknowledged studying with DeRosa.

 Nathan Campbell (Professor of French horn, The Master's University)
 James Thatcher (Session player, recipient of the Most Valuable Player Award from the National Association of Recording Arts and Sciences)
 Brian O'Connor (Professor of Horn at UCLA)
 Henry Sigismonti (Principal Horn of the Los Angeles Philharmonic under Zubin Mehta)
 George Price (Longtime third Horn of the Los Angeles Philharmonic)
 Suzette Moriarty (California Philharmonic)
 Laura Brenes (Principal horn player for the Redlands Symphony Orchestra)
 Richard Todd (Professor of horn at Frost School of Music)
 Dylan S. Hart (Principal horn of the Hollywood Bowl Orchestra under Thomas Wilkins)

Awards and honors 

 Grammy Nomination: Best Classical Performance – Chamber Music for The Intimate Bach (1962)
 The Vince DeRosa Scholarship Fund was established in DeRosa's name and currently supports the IHS Solo Contest (2003)
 Elected as an honorary member of the International Horn Society (2004)
 The Hollywood Epic Brass Organ and Percussion Ensemble recorded The Vince DeRosa Tribute Album (2014)
 Local 47 Lifetime Achievement Award (2017)

Personal life 

Beginning in the late 1950s, DeRosa played a Conn 8D horn. In the 1950s he taught a small number of students at the Los Angeles Conservatory of Music but otherwise taught formally at the University of Southern California from 1974–2005. Since retiring in 2008, DeRosa split his time between his residences in La Canada, CA, Maui, and Montana.

DeRosa's uncle, Vincent DeRubertis, also played with Sinatra on at least one occasion, on the soundtrack for High Society. Like his nephew, DeRubertis also contributed to many soundtracks.

DeRosa died on July 18, 2022, at the age of 101.

Discography 

With The 5th Dimension

 Earthbound (ABC, 1975)

With Laurie Allyn

 Paradise (VSOP, 1957)

With Laurindo Almeida

 The Intimate Bach, Duets with the Spanish Guitar Vol.2 (Capitol, 1962)

With American Flyer

 American Flyer (United Artists, 1976)

With Louis Armstrong

 Louis Under the Stars (Verve, 1958)
 I've Got the World on a String (Verve, 1960)

With Louis Armstrong and Ella Fitzgerald

 Porgy and Bess (Verve, 1958)

With David Axelrod

 Song of Innocence (Capitol, 1968)

With Hoyt Axton

 Life Machine (A&M, 1974)

With The Blackbyrds

 Unfinished Business (Fantasy, 1976)

With Vernon Burch

 Love-a-Thon (Chocolate City, 1978)

With Red Callender

 Callender Speaks Low (Crown, 1954)

With Glen Campbell

 Somethin' 'Bout You Baby I Like (Capitol, 1980)

With June Christy

 Something Cool (Capitol, 1954)
 Fair and Warmer! (Capitol, 1957)
 The Song is June! (Capitol, 1958)
 This Time of Year (Capitol, 1961)
 Do-Re-Mi (Capitol, 1961)

With Stanley Clarke

 Rocks, Pebbles and Sand (Epic, 1980)

With Nat King Cole

 To Whom It May Concern (Capitol, 1959)

With Natalie Cole

 Unforgettable... with Love (Elektra, 1991)

With Judy Collins

 Hard Times for Lovers (Capitol, 1979)

With Alice Coltrane

 Eternity (Warner Bros., 1975)

With Rita Coolidge

 Rita Coolidge (A&M, 1971)

With Sonny Criss

 Warm and Sonny (Muse, 1975)

With Michael Davis

 Brass Nation (Hip-Bone Music, 2000)

With Miles Davis

 Dingo (Warner Bros., 1991)

With Sammy Davis Jr.

 The Wham of Sam (Reprise, 1961)
 Sammy Davis Jr. Belts the Best of Broadway (Reprise, 1962)

With Sammy Davis Jr. and Carmen McRae

 Boy Meets Girl (Decca, 1957)
 Porgy and Bess (Decca, 1959)

With John Denver

 An Evening with John Denver (RCA, 1975)

With Teri DeSario

 Teri DeSario (Casablanca, 1979)

With Neil Diamond

 Jonathan Livingston Seagull (Columbia, 1973)
 September Morn (Columbia, 1979)

With Lamont Dozier

 Out Here on My Own (ABC Records, 1973)

With Earth, Wind & Fire

 Faces (Columbia, 1980)

With Billy Eckstine

 Once More with Feeling (EmArcy, 1958)

With The Emotions

 Rejoice (Columbia, 1977)

With Juan García Esquivel

 See it in Sound (RCA, 1999, recorded 1960)

With Don Fagerquist

 Music to Fill a Void (Mode, 1957)

With José Feliciano

 Angela (Private Stock, 1976)

With Clare Fischer

 Extension (Pacific Jazz, 1963)

With Ella Fitzgerald

 Ella Fitzgerald Sings the Rodgers & Hart Song Book (Verve, 1956)
 Ella Swings Lightly (Verve, 1958)
 Ella Fitzgerald Sings the George and Ira Gershwin Song Book (Verve, 1959)

With Dan Fogelberg and Tim Weisberg

 Twin Sons of Different Mothers (Epic, 1978)

With Donna Fuller

 My Foolish Heart (Liberty, 1957)

With Judy Garland

 The Letter (Capitol, 1959)

With Barry Gibb

 Now Voyager (Polydor, 1984)

With Harpers Bizarre

 Feelin' Groovy (Warner Bros., 1967)

With Debbie Harry

 KooKoo (Chrysalis Records., 1981)

With Neil Hefti

 Jazz Pop (Reprise, 1962)

With The Hi-Lo's

 The Hi-Lo's And All That Jazz (Columbia, 1958)

With Bill Holman

 Bill Holman's Great Big Band! (Capitol, 1960)

With Paul Horn

 Plenty of Horn (Dot, 1958)

With Freddie Hubbard

 Ride Like the Wind (Elektra, 1982)

With Gordon Jenkins

 Soul of a People (Mainstream, 1967)

With Stan Kenton

 Back to Balboa (Capitol, 1958)
 Kenton / Wagner (Capitol, 1964)
 Stan Kenton Conducts the Los Angeles Neophonic Orchestra (Capitol, 1965)
 Stan Kenton Presents Gabe Baltazar (Creative World Records, 1979)

With Peggy Lee

 The Man I Love (Capitol, 1957)
 Sugar 'n' Spice (Capitol, 1961)
 Let's Love (Atlantic, 1974)

With Henry Mancini

 The Music from Peter Gunn (RCA 1959)
 The Blues and the Beat (RCA, 1960)
 Mr. Lucky Goes Latin (RCA, 1961)
 Days of Wine and Roses (soundtrack) (Warner Bros., 1962)
 Uniquely Mancini (RCA, 1963)
 A Merry Mancini Christmas (RCA, 1966)
 Mancini '67 (RCA, 1967)
 Country Gentleman (RCA, 1974)

With Johnny Mandel

 I Want to Live (United Artists, 1958)
 The Sandpiper (Verve, 1965)

With Chuck Mangione

 Chase the Clouds Away (A&M, 1975)
 Bellavia (A&M, 1988)

With Gap Mangione

 Suite: Lady (A&M, 1978)

With Barry Manilow

 Even Now (Arista, 1978)

With Shelly Manne

 Concerto for Clarinet & Combo (Contemporary, 1957)
 Manne–That's Gershwin! (Capitol, 1965)

With Skip Martin

 Scheherajazz (Stereo-Fidelity, 1959)

With Johnny Mathis and Deniece Williams

 That's What Friends Are For (A&M, 1978)

With Billy May

 Billy May's Big Fat Brass (Capitol, 1958)
 Sorta-Dixie (Capitol, 1954)

With Les McCann

 The Man (A&M, 1978)

With Carmen McRae

 Carmen for Cool Ones (Decca, 1958)
 The Sound of Silence (Atlantic, 1968)

With Sérgio Mendes

 Brasil '88 (Elektra, 1978)

With The Monkees

 Headquarters (RCA, 1967)
 Pisces, Aquarius, Capricorn & Jones Ltd. (RCA, 1967)
 The Birds, The Bees & The Monkees (RCA, 1968)
 Instant Replay (RCA, 1969)

With Mystic Moods Orchestra

 Extensions (Philips, 1969)

With Oliver Nelson

 Skull Session (Flying Dutchman, 1975)

With Michael Nesmith

 The Wichita Train Whistle Sings (Dot, 1968)

With Sammy Nestico

 Dark Orchid (Palo Alto, 1981)

With Harry Nilsson

 Son of Schmilsson (RCA, 1972)
 ...That's the Way It Is (RCA, 1976)

With Michael Omartian

 Adam Again (Myrrh, 1976)

With Lee Oskar

 My Road, Our Road (Elektra, 1981)

With Patti Page

 In the Land of Hi-Fi (EmArcy, 1956)

With Marty Paich

 The Picasso of Big-Band Jazz (Cadence, 1958)
 The Broadway Bit (Warner Bros., 1959)
 I Get a Boot Out of You (Warner Bros., 1960)

With Van Dyke Parks

 Song Cycle (Warner Bros., 1967)

With Art Pepper

 Art Pepper + Eleven - Modern Jazz Classics (Contemporary/OJC, 1961)

With David Pomeranz

 The Truth of Us (Pacific, 1980)

With Jean-Luc Ponty

 Cantaloupe Island (Blue Note, 1976)
 King Kong: Jean-Luc Ponty Plays the Music of Frank Zappa (World Pacific, 1970)

With Pure Prairie League

 Two Lane Highway (RCA, 1975)

With Johnny Richards

 Something Else by Johnny Richards (Bethlehem, 1956)

With Minnie Riperton

 Minnie (Capitol, 1979)

With Mavis Rivers

 Mavis (Reprise, 1961)

With George Roberts

 Practice Makes Perfect (DNE Records, 1969)

With Pete Rugolo

 Introducing Pete Rugolo (Columbia, 1954)
 Rugolomania (Columbia, 1955)
 Music for Hi-Fi Bugs (EmArcy, 1956)
 Out on a Limb (EmArcy 1957)
 New Sounds by Pete Rugolo (Harmony, 1957)
 An Adventure in Sound: Brass in Hi-Fi (Mercury, 1958)
 The Music from Richard Diamond (EmArcy, 1959)
 Behind Brigitte Bardot (Warner Bros., 1960)
 The Original Music of Thriller (United Recording Studios, 1961)

With Pharoah Sanders

 Love Will Find a Way (Arista, 1978)

With Arturo Sandoval

 Dream Come True (GRP, 1999)

With Boz Scaggs

 Silk Degrees (Columbia, 1976)

With Diane Schuur

 Love Songs (GRP, 1993)

With Jack Sheldon

 Jack Sheldon and His All Star Band (GNP Crescendo, 1957)

With Lalo Schifrin

 Jazz Suite on the Mass Texts (RCA Victor, 1965) with Paul Horn
 Music from Mission: Impossible (Dot, 1967)
 The Fox (soundtrack) (Warner Bros., 1968)
 There's a Whole Lalo Schifrin Goin' On (Dot, 1968)
 Kelly's Heroes (soundtrack) (MGM, 1970)
 Enter the Dragon (soundtrack) (Warner Bros., 1973)

With Doc Severinson

 Facets (Amherst, 1990)

With Horace Silver

 Silver 'n Brass (Blue Note, 1975)

With Frank Sinatra

 Christmas Songs by Sinatra (Columbia, 1948)
 In the Wee Small Hours (Capitol, 1955)
 Close to You (Capitol, 1956)
 Where Are You? (Capitol, 1957)
 Sings for Only the Lonely (Capitol, 1958)
 Look to Your Heart (Capitol, 1959)
 Come Swing with Me! (Capitol, 1961)
 Point of No Return (Capitol, 1962)
 Strangers in the Night (Reprise, 1966)
 Ol' Blue Eyes Is Back (Reprise, 1973)
 Some Nice Things I've Missed (Reprise, 1974)

With Judee Sill

 Heart Food (Asylum, 1973)

With J. D. Souther

 Black Rose (Asylum, 1976)

With Duane Tatro

 Duane Tatro's Jazz For Moderns (Contemporary, 1956)

With The Temptations

 Bare Back (Atlantic, 1978)

With Cal Tjader

 West Side Story (Fantasy, 1961)

With Mel Tormé

 Mel Tormé and the Marty Paich Dek-Tette (Bethlehem, 1955)
 Mel Tormé Sings Fred Astaire (Bethlehem, 1956)
 The Complete Porgy and Bess (Bethlehem, 1956)
 California Suite (Bethlehem, 1957)
 Mel Tormé Swings Shubert Alley (Verve, 1960)
 Swingin' on the Moon (Verve, 1960)
 Broadway, Right Now! (Verve, 1960)

With Tower of Power

 Back to Oakland (Warner Bros., 1974)

With Stanley Turrentine

 Have You Ever Seen the Rain (Fantasy, 1975)

With Sarah Vaughan

 Sarah Vaughan with Michel Legrand (Mainstream, 1972)

With Paul Weston

 Carefree (Capitol, 1959)

With Mason Williams

 A Gift of Song (Riviera, 2003)

With Frank Zappa

 Lumpy Gravy (Capitol, 1967)

Notes

References

External links 
 Vincent DeRosa biography at the International Horn Society home page
 Miller, Todd (2009). Carved in Stone
 
 

1920 births
2022 deaths
American horn players
Musicians from Los Angeles
Military personnel from Missouri
Horn players
American centenarians
Men centenarians
United States Army Air Forces personnel of World War II
20th-century American musicians
20th-century American male musicians
21st-century American musicians
21st-century American male musicians
Musicians from Kansas City, Missouri
Musicians from Chicago
American people of Italian descent